Mount Jason is a peak just west of Bull Pass in the Olympus Range of Victoria Land, Antarctica. It was named by the Victoria University of Wellington Antarctic Expedition (1958–59) for Jason, a figure in Greek mythology.

References

Mountains of Victoria Land
McMurdo Dry Valleys
Jason